Epsilon Canis Majoris is a binary star system and the second-brightest object in the constellation of Canis Major. Its name is a Bayer designation that is Latinised from ε Canis Majoris, and abbreviated Epsilon CMa or ε CMa. This is the 22nd-brightest star in the night sky with an apparent magnitude of 1.50. About 4.7 million years ago, it was the brightest star in the night sky, with an apparent magnitude of −3.99. Based upon parallax measurements obtained during the Hipparcos mission, it is about 430 light-years distant from the Sun.

The two components are designated ε Canis Majoris A, officially named Adhara  – the traditional name of the system, and B.

Nomenclature

ε Canis Majoris (Latinised to Epsilon Canis Majoris) is the binary system's Bayer designation. The designations of the two components as ε Canis Majoris A and B derive from the convention used by the Washington Multiplicity Catalog (WMC) for multiple star systems, and adopted by the International Astronomical Union (IAU).

ε Canis Majoris bore the traditional name Adhara (sometimes spelled Adara, Adard, Udara or Udra), derived from the Arabic word عذارى 'aðāra', "virgins". In 2016, the International Astronomical Union organized a Working Group on Star Names (WGSN) to catalogue and standardize proper names for stars. The WGSN decided to attribute proper names to individual stars rather than entire star systems. It approved the name Adhara for the star ε Canis Majoris A on 21 August 2016 and it is now so included in the List of IAU-approved Star Names.

In the 17th-century catalogue of stars in the Calendarium of Al Achsasi al Mouakket, this star was designated Aoul al Adzari (أول العذاري awwal al-adhara), which was translated into Latin as Prima Virginum, meaning First of the Virgins. Along with δ Canis Majoris (Wezen), η Canis Majoris (Aludra) and ο2 Canis Majoris (Thanih al Adzari), these stars were Al ʽAdhārā (العذاري), 'the Virgins'.

Physical properties

ε Canis Majoris is a binary star. The primary, ε Canis Majoris A, has an apparent magnitude of +1.5 and belongs to the spectral classification B2. Its color is blue or blueish-white, due to the surface temperature of 22,200K. It emits a total radiation equal to 38,700 times that of the Sun. This star is the brightest source of extreme ultraviolet in the night sky.
It is the strongest source of photons capable of ionizing hydrogen atoms in interstellar gas near the Sun, and is very important in determining the ionization state of the Local Interstellar Cloud.

The +7.5-magnitude (the absolute magnitude amounts to +1.9) companion star, ε Canis Majoris B, is 7.5" away with a position angle of 161° of the main star. Despite the relatively large angular distance the components can only be resolved in large telescopes, since the primary is approximately 250 times brighter than its companion.

A few million years ago, ε Canis Majoris was much closer to the Sun than it is at present, causing it to be a much brighter star in the night sky. About 4.7 million years ago, Adhara was 34 light-years from the Sun, and was the brightest star in the sky with a magnitude of –3.99. No other star has attained this brightness since, nor will any other star attain this brightness for at least five million years.

In culture 
USS Adhara (AK-71) was a U.S. Navy Crater-class cargo ship named after the star.

ε Canis Majoris appears on the national flag of Brazil, symbolising the state of Tocantins.

References 

B-type bright giants
Binary stars

Canis Major
Canis Majoris, Epsilon
2618
CD-28 03666
Canis Majoris, 21
052089
033579
Adhara